Simbirskiasaurus is an extinct genus of ichthyosaur from the Early Cretaceous (early Barremian) of Ulyanovsk Oblast, Russia. Its type specimen is YKM 65119, a fragmentary skull and vertebral column.

Description
Fischer et al. give the diagnosis of Simbirskiasaurus as follows: "Platypterygiine ophthalmosaurid characterized by the following autapomorphies: external naris divided by a nasomaxillary pillar; posterior opening of the narial complex with anteroposteriorly constricted dorsal extension; deeply interdigitating prefrontal–lacrimal suture [reminiscent of the basal neoichthyosaurian Temnodontosaurus platyodon (Conybeare, 1822); see Godefroit, 1993]. Simbirskiasaurus birjukovi is also characterized by the following unique combination of features: subnarial process of the premaxilla reaches the posterior margin of the external naris (shared with Cryopterygius kristiansenae Druckenmiller et al., 2012); elongated anterior process of the maxilla, reaching anteriorly the level of the nasal [unlike in Aegirosaurus leptospondylus Bardet & Fernández, 2000 and Sveltonectes insolitus (Fischer et al., 2011b)]; pres- ence of a supranarial process of the premaxilla [shared with Platypterygius australis (McCoy, 1867), see Kear, 2005, and possibly Pervushovisaurus bannovkensis (Arkhangelsky, 1998b)]."

Phylogeny
The following cladogram shows a possible phylogenetic position of Simbirskiasaurus in Ophthalmosauridae according to the analysis performed by Zverkov and Jacobs (2020).

See also
 List of ichthyosaurs
 Timeline of ichthyosaur research

References

Ophthalmosauridae
Ichthyosauromorph genera